In telecommunications, a channel bank is a device that performs multiplexing or demultiplexing ("demux") of a group of communications channels, such as analog or digital telephone lines, into one channel of higher bandwidth or higher digital bit rate, such as a DS-1 (T1) circuit, so that all the channels can be sent simultaneously over a single cable called a trunkline.

A channel bank may be located in a telephone exchange, or in an enterprise's telephone closet or enclosure where it "breaks out" individual telephone lines from a high-capacity telephone trunk line connected to the central telephone office, or the enterprise's PBX system.

See also 

 Multiplexer
 Multiplexing
 Digital Signal 1
 Carrier system

References

Telecommunications systems
Communication circuits
Multiplexing